Sneem GAA is an intermediate Gaelic Athletic Association club from County Kerry, Ireland. They have won 4 South Kerry Senior Football Championships in 1972, 1977, 1997 and 1998, Kerry Junior Football Championship in 1997.

Achievements
 South Kerry Senior Football Championship: (4) 1972, 1977, 1997, 1998
 Kerry Junior Football Championship: (1) 1997
 Kerry County League Division 5
 Kerry County League Division 4
 Kerry County League Division 3
 Kerry County League Division 2

Notable players
 John Egan
 Killian Burns
 Ronan Hussey

The current panel of players includes several key members of the all conquering South Kerry divisional combination that won the Kerry County Senior Championship in 2004, 2005, 2006 and 2009. These include Mark Drummond, Killian Burns, Brendan Teahan, David Drummond, Sean Hussey, Leonard Burns, Ronan Hussey, Darran Breen and Mike O'Neill.

Gaelic games clubs in County Kerry
Gaelic football clubs in County Kerry